Opisthostoma jucundum is a species of land snail with an operculum, a terrestrial gastropod mollusk in the family Diplommatinidae.

This species is endemic to the island of Mantanani Besar, Sabah, Malaysia. The species is found solely on an exposed limestone ridge near the northern end of Mantanani Besar within tropical coastal forests. The extent of its occurrence is less than 1km2 , and is threatened by habitat loss. Local villages and plantations of bananas and tropical fruit have encroached upon the limestone cliffs, leading to the desiccation of the forests in the region. The population of the species is decreasing.

References

Endemic fauna of Malaysia
Invertebrates of Malaysia
Diplommatinidae
Taxonomy articles created by Polbot